Constantin Alexandrovich Westchiloff born Константин Александрович Вещилов / Konstantin Aleksandrovich Veschilov was a Russian-American artist known for portraits, genre scenes, landscapes, and seascapes. He was also an accomplished graphic artist and set designer. Death records for Westchloff indicate that he was born in St. Petersburg, Russia, 5 December 1878, and died 23 April 1945 in New York. Some sources, including Benezit Dictionary of Artists, list the date of birth for Westchiloff as 20 November 1877. Another source lists his date of birth as 15/28 May 1878. Another source lists his date of birth as 27 May 1878. Westchiloff latinized his name to Constantin A. Westchiloff in 1922, when he took residency in France.  Westchiloff's cause of death was heart attack. He was buried 25 April 1945 in Mount Olivet Cemetery (Queens), in Maspeth, Queens, New York. One biographer has described Westchiloff as "an enigmatic character."

Early life 

Westchiloff was born to a merchant family in St. Petersburg, Russia. His father was named Alexander; his mother, Anna Vassilieva.

Artistic Training 

Westchiloff received his first painting lessons at Valaam Monastery under the guidance of Father Luke, who was in charge of painting the main cathedral of the monastery. At the age of 15, in 1893, Westchiloff began studies at the Drawing School of the Society for the Promotion of the Arts  in St. Petersburg. He continued studies there until 1896, when he began a two-year term of studies under Ilya Repin at the St. Petersburg art school founded by Princess Maria Tenisheva.

Between 1898 and 1904 Westchiloff continued studies under Repin at the Imperial Academy of Arts, informally known as the St. Petersburg Academy of Arts. There, Repin singled out Weshchiloff among his talented students not only as a beloved, but also as a "personal student." During studies at the Academy, Westchiloff lived with another poor student, I. Tryapichnikov, in Repin's studio apartment, fully supported by Repin. Westchiloff spent most summers at Repin's dacha — a time which Westchiloff used for improving his skills at plein air painting. A sketch created by Repin in 1898 depicts Westchiloff, Tryapichnikov, and Repin's son, Yuri, in plein air exercises at Repin's dacha.

In November 1904, Westchiloff concluded his studies with the Royal Academy with formal review of his painting, Ivan the Terrible After the Triumph of Kazan. Per the success of that review, Westchiloff graduated with a gold medal — receiving the title of artist and support for foreign study in Italy for a period of one year, from January 1, 1905, at public expense.

Career in Russia 

In 1902, through support from Repin, Westchiloff received his first commission: a large diorama entitled The Founding of St. Petersburg. That diorama was for celebrations of that city's bicentennial in 1903.

Also in 1902, while still a student at the Imperial Academy, Constantin Westchiloff began to exhibit work at Moscow exhibitions — showing portraits and genre paintings. The painting, One the Way, 1903, is representative of Westchiloff's genre work in the early 1900s.

In 1904 Westchiloff became a permanent exhibitor of the Society of Russian Watercolors. After artist Vasily Vereshchagin died on 13 April 1904, a civilian casualty on a Russian battleship serving in the Russo-Japanese War, Westchiloff took over the execution of the orders of the Admiralty.

In 1905, Westchiloff received the A. I Kuindzhi prize for his painting, Forgiveness Sunday in Russia in the 17th century. Also in 1905, while on his traveling fellowship in Italy and France, Westchiloff began to work on a canvas entitled, Julius Caesar: The Last Entrance to the Senate. Westchiloff was unable to complete this painting before the end that year. Therefore, the Imperial Art Academy extended the fellowship for a second year — into 1906. The Academy was generally satisfied with the completed Julius Caesar. However, the Academy denied Westchiloff's written request to have his fellowship extended for a third year — into 1907 — so that he could "study the life of the northern peoples and the history of Norway."

.

In 1906, Westchiloff participated in the Royal Academy's First Fall Exhibition in St. Petersburg. Westchiloff exhibited his painting, Breakthrough of the Cruiser Askold in 1904 in the Yellow Sea, which interpreted a scene in the Russo-Japanese War of 1904-1905. He also exhibited his portraits of Count Nikolay Muravyov-Amursky and of Lieut. S. Poguljajeff.

In 1907, Westchiloff, inspired by his love of ancient history, painted a picture entitled, Mary on the Ruins of Carthage, which received only a modest review:

Westchiloff enrolled in a course of study at St. Petersburg's Imperial Archaeological Institute, which he completed in 1908. Coordinated with his studies there, Westchiloff presented several large paintings presenting scenes from ancient history. However, none of them received the amount of acclaim he was about to receive for depictions of Russian history — in a series of paintings that included these two titles from 1907, both purchased by M.E. Sinitsyn, a prominent disciple of the Ryazhitsa Old Believers.

On the Volga in the Old Days: Stenka Razin before the Campaign against Astrakhan in 1669.
Received the top honor in the All-Russian annual competition of the Society for the Encouragement of Arts.
Received an award in the amount of 2,000 rubles for winning the First Anniversary Prize, which was named after Her Imperial Highness Princess Eugenia Maximilianovna of Leuchtenberg, wife of Duke Alexander Petrovich of Oldenburg. 
The Trial of Archpriest Avvakum in the Golden Patriarch Ward May 13, 1666.
Reviewed by the Moscow press as "a major creation of the paint brush... a picture that shines with dignity. The bright vestments of the church fathers are painted with taste, in a noble, not flashy scale. The figures are molded and enveloped in air... Veshchilov is at his best in this picture.... The entire Old Believer world of the Volga region is interested in the painting... the artist, classified as one of the outstanding masters of the 'Russian style'."

In 1910, Westchiloff worked for the first time as set designer. He produced sets for "Tsar Dmitry the Pretender and Princess Ksenia," written by Aleksey Suvorin and staged at Suvorin's Theater of the Literary and Art Society in St. Petersburg.

In 1911, Westchiloff became a permanent member of the Society of Russian Watercolors, appointed chief artist of the Naval Ministry with the rank of collegiate secretary — filling a position that had been vacant since the death of Alexey Bogolyubov in 1896. As the official artist of the Russian Navy, Westchiloff produced a series of large canvases dedicated to the naval battles of the Russo-Japanese War. That series included these titles:

Squadron of Admiral Rozhdestvensky.
Anchorage of Military Ships in Port Arthur.
The Beginning of the End, for which Westchiloff received the First Prize for Historical Painting in the Society for the Encouragement of Arts.
An Unexpected Arrival, acquired by the President of the Academy of Arts, Grand Duchess Maria Pavlovna of Russia (1890–1958).

After the Russian Revolution of 1917, Westchiloff worked with a group of artists that created propaganda (agitprop) theatrical sets at the Petrograd Technical Institute. In 1919, Westchiloff contributed works to the First Free State Exhibition in Petrograd.

Emigration from Russia 

Westchiloff emigrated from Soviet Russia in 1922, lived in Italy until 1928, and lived in France 1929-1936. Passenger lists document multiple New York arrivals for Constantin. In his first arrival, dated 26 Sep 1935, he crossed the Atlantic alone on the SS Île de France. Three subsequent, yearly crossings were with his wife Marie. They arrived in New York on the SS Normandie on 23 July 1936. Their next two crossings were on the Île de France: one arrival dated 8 June 1937, the other dated 14 Oct 1938.

Career in France 

Westchiloff's studio in Paris looked directly out at the Seine River. Records of Hôtel Drouot, a large auction house in Paris, document sales of some paintings which Westchiloff produced while living in France. In the spring of 1928 in Paris, Westchiloff exhibited paintings at the Galeries Jean Charpentier, 76 Rue du Faubourg-Saint-Honoré (that location in Paris now occupied by Sotheby's France). This was the second exhibition for Westchiloff at Jean Charpentier.

Between 1928 and 1930 Westchiloff worked in Paris as set designer for and director of the Russian Intimate Theater of D. N. Kirova. From 1933 until his departure from France, Westchiloff was a member of the board of the Artists Section at the Union of Russian Art Workers in France. Westchiloff also participated in group exhibitions of Russian émigré artists — one show in 1930 in Belgrade and such shows in Paris in 1931 and 1932.

Career in the United States 

The U.S. Federal census of 1940 documents Constantine and Marie as living in Ward 15, Manhattan. Their address, initially leased in October 1939, was 58 West 57th Street in New York City.  In New York, Westchiloff was a member of the Repin Society of Russian Artists and an honorary member of the Society of Former Russian Naval Officers in America. Westchiloff donated paintings for charity auctions that benefited the Union of Former Russian Judicial Officers, the Moscow Community, the Sea Assembly, and other organizations.

Donated his paintings for charity lotteries in favor of the Union of Former Russian Judicial Officers, the Moscow Community, the Sea Assembly and other organizations. In 1937, his paintings were exhibited at the Metropolitan Museum of Art in New York.

In the late 1930s and early 1940s Westchiloff left his studio in New York City to paint seascapes and harbor scenes in coastal New England frequently painting in and around the town of Ogunquit, Maine. Westchiloff was also fond of painting mountain streams in snow — depicting scenes in the Adirondack Mountains.

On 13 January 1936 New York's Reynolds Gallery opened a show with works by Westchiloff, whom the press identified as a former Russian court painter. The New York Times'''s formal review followed a few days later:

Later in 1936 that venue, renamed as Reynolds-Metropolitan Gallery, showed Westchiloff paintings, which the press reviewed as "fairly high in key... chiefly of the picturesque — sometimes illustrative — the landscapes more so than the portraits." In April 1942, Metropolitan-Reynolds moved from its location on East 57th Street to a larger space on the ground floor of 50 Rockefeller Plaza. The inaugural exhibition in that location featured works by Westchiloff.

In May 1939, Westchiloff participated in a group show at the Municipal Art Galleries, 3 East 67th Street. Westchiloff exhibited his works there alongside works of other artists with reputations for theatrical art as well as easel painting.

In early February 1959, several years after Westchiloff's death, the Lock Galleries in New York sold a set of 28 paintings and etchings by Westchiloff to collector Robert Lehman. From that purchase, Lehman subsequently donated five paintings and one etching to the collection which bears his name at the Metropolitan Museum of Art, New York.

 Artistic Evaluation 

A catalog of the Lehman Collection of the Metropolitan Museum, New York, describes Westchiloff's paintings from his time in Russia as naturalistic and notes that Westchiloff did not explore ideas of Russian avant-garde movements — neither Suprematism nor Constructivism (art). Another curator states that Westchiloff's work — particularly after his travels in western Europe and America — is closest to Impressionism in style.

 Notes 

 References Aquarelles, dessins, gouaches, pastels par Adler, Asselin, Biva, Boulay, Calvera, Cocteau, Denarie, Drevet, Favre, Gelinet, Gen Paul, Gillot, Gir, Granchi Taylor, Hamon, Herbo, Jacovleff, Kupka, Lebasque, Lemaire, Maclet, Manzana Pissarro, Nicol, Pascin, Pavoni Roma, Pike, Poulbot, Rose, Rouault, Shepherd, Steinlen, Weissmann, Zandomeneghi. Hôtel Drouot, France, n.p., 1970.
Bal, Georges. "Paris Art Notes." New York Herald Tribune. European edition, 31 March 1928.
Capodilupo, Anthony. "Constantin Westchiloff." Ask Art, https://www.askart.com/artist/Constantin_Alexandrovitch_Westchiloff/23343/Constantin_Alexandrovitch_Westchiloff.aspx, written September 2004, accessed 22 January 2021.  
"Constantin Westchiloff: Keywords." Ask Art. https://www.askart.com/artist_keywords/Constantin_Alexandrovitch_Westchiloff/23343/Constantin_Alexandrovitch_Westchiloff.aspx, accessed 20 January 2021.
"Constantin Westchiloff: Marine Painter, Former Official to Russian Navy", obituary, New York Times, 24 April 1945.
Falk, Peter H. Who Was Who In American Art: Compiled From the Original Thirty-four Volumes of American Art Annual—Who's Who In Art, Biographies of American Artists Active From 1898-1947. Madison, Conn.: Sound View Press, 1985.Deuxième Exposition Des Œuvres De Westchiloff. Galerie Charpentier, Paris, 1928.
DeVree, Howard. "A Reviewer's Notebook: Comment on a Score of Exhibitions in the Galleries." New York Times. 19 January 1936, p. 10.
DeVree, Howard. "Among the Newly Opened Exhibitions: Briefs from a Reviewer's Notebook Concerning Some of the Attractions in the Galleries." New York Times. 29 November 1936, p. 10.Google Maps. https://www.google.com/maps/place/76+Rue+du+Faubourg+Saint-Honor%C3%A9,+75008+Paris,+France/@48.8705429,2.3155824,17z/data=!3m1!4b1!4m5!3m4!1s0x47e66fcc1f5851eb:0xb149a723989a5d39!8m2!3d48.8705429!4d2.3177764
"Konstantin Aleksandrovich Veschilov Westchiloff." Find A Grave. http://www.findagrave.com/memorial/198565285/konstantin-aleksandrovich-westchiloff, accessed 20 Jan 2020.
 Lee, Natalie H. "Constantin Alexandrovitch Westchiloff." In The Robert Lehman Collection. Vol. 3, Nineteenth- and Twentieth-Century Paintings. The Metropolitan Museum of Art, New York, in association with Princeton University Press, 2009, p. 296.
Leikind, O. L. "Veshilov Konstantin Alexandrovich." Art and Architecture of the Russian Abroad. http://artrz.ru/1804782924.html, uploaded 6 September 2011, accessed 19 January 2021.
"New York Artists Show Their Wares." New York Times. 24 May 1939, p. 28.
"New York, New York City Municipal Deaths, 1795-1949," database, FamilySearch (https://familysearch.org/ark:/61903/1:1:2WPJ-ZW5 : 10 February 2018), Constantine Westchiloff, 23 Apr 1945; citing Death, Manhattan, New York, New York, United States, New York Municipal Archives, New York; FHL microfilm 2,132,437.
 "New York, New York Passenger and Crew Lists, 1909, 1925-1957," database with images, FamilySearch (https://familysearch.org/ark:/61903/1:1:24VG-PJX : 12 March 2018), Constantin Westchiloff, 1935; citing Immigration, New York, New York, United States, NARA microfilm publication T715 (Washington, D.C.: National Archives and Records Administration, n.d.).
 "New York, New York Passenger and Crew Lists, 1909, 1925-1957," database with images, FamilySearch (https://familysearch.org/ark:/61903/1:1:24K4-4L5 : 12 March 2018), Constantin Westchiloff, 1936; citing Immigration, New York, New York, United States, NARA microfilm publication T715 (Washington, D.C.: National Archives and Records Administration, n.d.).
 "New York, New York Passenger and Crew Lists, 1909, 1925-1957," database with images, FamilySearch (https://familysearch.org/ark:/61903/1:1:24KY-47D : 12 March 2018), Constantin Westchiloff, 1937; citing Immigration, New York, New York, United States, NARA microfilm publication T715 (Washington, D.C.: National Archives and Records Administration, n.d.).
 "New York, New York Passenger and Crew Lists, 1909, 1925-1957," database with images, FamilySearch (https://familysearch.org/ark:/61903/1:1:242J-MCD : 12 March 2018), Constantin Westchiloff, 1938; citing Immigration, New York, New York, United States, NARA microfilm publication T715 (Washington, D.C.: National Archives and Records Administration, n.d.).
"Other Openings Today: Westchiloff Paintings Included." New York Times. 13 January 1936, p. 12.
"Reynolds Gallery to Move." New York Times. 13 June 1942, p. 24.
"Society for the Promotion of the Arts." Internet Encyclopedia of Ukraine. http://www.encyclopediaofukraine.com/display.asp?linkpath=pages%5CS%5CO%5CSocietyforthePromotionoftheArts.htm, accessed 14 Jan 2021.
Thieme-Becker. "Veščilov, Konstantin Aleksandrovič." Allgemeines Lexikon der bildenden Künstler von der Antike bis zur Gegenwart (General Dictionary of Artists from Antiquity to the Present), Bd 35, s 434 (1942), translated by Elizabeth D. Searles, Princeton, New Jersey, 1986.
"Veshilov Konstantin Alexandrovich." Russian Landscape. http://russkiy-peyzazh.ru/khudozhniki/veshchilov-konstantin-aleksandrovich, translated by Google, accessed 14 Jan 2021.
"Veschilov, Konstantin Aleksandrovich or Westchilov." Benezit Dictionary of Artists, Oxford University Press, doi.org/10.1093/benz/9780199773787.article.B00196286, uploaded 31 October 2011, accessed 19 January 2021.
"West Side Renting Shows No Let-up." New York Times. 5 October 1939, p. 47.
Zubova, V.R. "75 Years Since the Death of K.A. Veshchilov." Museum of the Russian Diaspora'', http://www.domrz.ru/press/memo_dates/75_let_so_dnya_konchiny_k_a_veshchilova/, translated by Google, published 4 April 2020, accessed 20 January 2021.

1878 births
1945 deaths
19th-century painters from the Russian Empire
Russian male painters
20th-century Russian painters
Russian Impressionist painters
Recipients of the Order of St. Vladimir, 4th class
Recipients of the Order of St. Anna, 2nd class
Emigrants from the Russian Empire to Italy
Emigrants from the Russian Empire to France
White Russian emigrants to France
White Russian emigrants to the United States
White Russian emigrants to Italy
Burials at Mount Olivet Cemetery (Queens)